Algoma Tankers Limited is a subsidiary of Canada's Algoma Central Marine, the country's largest inland shipping company.
The firm's fleet has seven vessels,

Some of the vessels are built to withstand traveling through moderate ice and operate in the winter.

References

Companies based in Ontario
Shipping companies of Canada
Great Lakes Shipping Companies